Maackia is a genus of flowering plants in the legume family, Fabaceae. There are about 12 species, all native to eastern Asia, with six endemic to China. The generic name honors the botanist Richard Maack.

They are deciduous trees and shrubs. The alternately arranged leaves are divided into leaflets. The inflorescence is a simple or compound raceme of many flowers. Each flower has an inflated calyx with five teeth. The white or greenish corolla has a reflexed standard petal and keel petals that are fused at the bases. The fruit is a wide or narrow, flattened legume pod containing one to five flat seeds.

Species
Maackia comprises the following species:
 Maackia amurensis Rupr.—Amur maackia
 var. amurensis Rupr.
 var. buergeri (Maxim.) C.K.Schneid.
 Maackia australis (Dunn) Takeda

 Maackia chekiangensis S.S. Chien

 Maackia ellipticocarpa Merr.
 Maackia fauriei (H. Lév.) Takeda
 Maackia floribunda (Miq.) Takeda

 Maackia hupehensis Takeda
 Maackia hwashanensis W.T. Wang ex C.W. Chang
 Maackia tashiroi (Yatabe) Makino
 Maackia tenuifolia (Hemsl.) Hand.-Mazz.

Species names with uncertain taxonomic status
The status of the following species is unresolved:
Maackia taiwanensis Hoshi & Ohashi.

References

Sophoreae
Fabaceae genera